Hajji Dunya Gul Niazi Jamia Masjid is a mosque in the city of Mihtarlam in Laghman Province, Afghanistan. 
Construction work on two mosques was launched in 2017. The second mosque opened in 2021 and has a capacity of 2,000 worshippers at a time. The two-story mosque includes an Islamic sciences training center.

See also
List of mosques in Afghanistan

External links
Workers disinfect mosque in Mehtarlam, Afghanistan
Image of mosque
Video of mosque
Video of second mosque

References

Buildings and structures in Laghman Province
Mosques in Afghanistan